A drag count is a dimensionless unit used by aerospace engineers. 1 drag count is equal to a  of 0.0001.

Definition 

A drag count  is defined as:

 

where:
 is the drag force, which is by definition the force component in the direction of the flow velocity,
 is the mass density of the fluid,
 is the speed of the object relative to the fluid, and
 is the reference area.

The drag coefficient is used to compare the solutions of different geometries by means of a dimensionless number. A drag count is more user-friendly than the drag coefficient, as the latter is usually much less than 1. A drag count of 200 to 400 is typical for an airplane at cruise. A reduction of one drag count on a subsonic civil transport airplane means about  more in payload.

Notes

References

See also 
 Drag coefficient
 Zero-lift drag coefficient

Drag (physics)
Equations
Force